In Poland and Lithuania okolica szlachecka or akalica (in Lithuanian) is a kind of estate village (neighbourhood of the nobility), or a complex of several villages of the same first part of the name and different second part. In the past, it was a single settlement, but later it has split, as the property has been divided into several inheritors. Such localities were usually inhabited by yeomanry (drobna szlachta). They are common in the borderland of Mazovia and Podlachia in Poland and in central and north-west part of Lithuania. Many frequent toponymic (often noble) surnames are derived from their names.

Examples
Łapy (nowadays a town), the nest of Łapiński family
Wyszonki, from where Wyszyński

See also
zaścianek

References
Eduteka
Konteksty kultury ludowej Podlasia Tykocińskiego
Łapińscy
Akant
Herbarz

Geographic history of Poland
Polish nobility